The 2003–04 season was the 85th season in the existence of AS Saint-Étienne and the club's third consecutive season in the second division of French football. In addition to the domestic league, AS Saint-Étienne participated in this season's editions of the Coupe de France and the Coupe de la Ligue.

Players

First-team squad

Transfers

In

Out

Pre-season and friendlies

Competitions

Overall record

Ligue 2

League table

Results summary

Results by round

Matches

Source:

Coupe de France

Coupe de la Ligue

References

AS Saint-Étienne seasons
Saint-Étienne